Marta Unzué Urdániz (born 4 July 1988) is a Spanish footballer who plays as a defensive midfielder and occasionally as a right back for Primera División club Athletic Bilbao.

She spent over a decade with Barcelona, winning several trophies and featuring in the UEFA Women's Champions League.

Club career
Unzué arrived at Barcelona in 2006 from CA Osasuna, along with her twin sister Elba. The team performed poorly and were relegated in her first season. Elba left the club after four years, but Marta remained and was appointed captain after the departure of Vicky Losada in 2015. She maintained her role of first captain for two years.

On 24 July 2018, a deal was agreed for 30-year-old Unzué to join Athletic Bilbao on a two-year loan contract.

At the end of her loan contract, in April 2020, she announced her departure from FC Barcelona after 14 years with the club to permanently transfer to Athletic Bilbao. She left having recorded the second-most appearances of all time for Barcelona with 360.

Education
Unzué has obtained a degree in physical activity and sport science in 2010, and a master's degree in nutrition and food in 2014 from the University of Barcelona. She also has a Level 2 certificate in football coaching.

Personal life
Unzue's uncle is  general manager, Eusebio Unzué. Her other uncle, Juan Carlos Unzué played football for CA Osasuna, FC Barcelona and Sevilla FC as a goalkeeper.

Honours

 FC Barcelona
 Primera División (4): 2011–12, 2012–13, 2013–14, 2014–15
 Segunda División: 2007–08
 Copa de la Reina de Fútbol (5): 2011, 2013, 2014, 2017, 2018
 Copa Catalunya (8): 2009, 2010, 2011, 2012, 2014, 2015, 2016, 2017

References

External links

 
 
 Marta Unzué at FC Barcelona (archived)
 
 
 
 
 

1988 births
Living people
Spanish women's footballers
Primera División (women) players
FC Barcelona Femení players
Athletic Club Femenino players
People from Cuenca de Pamplona
Footballers from Navarre
Women's association football fullbacks
Women's association football midfielders
CA Osasuna Femenino players
Spanish twins
Twin sportspeople
University of Barcelona alumni